The United States Senate Committee on Canadian Relations existed from July 31, 1888, when it was created as a select committee, until April 18, 1921, and dealt with issues related to U.S. relations with Canada.  It became a standing committee on January 13, 1892.

Chairs of the Select Committee on Canadian Relations, 1888–1892

Chairs of the Committee on Canadian Relations, 1892–1921

Sources 

Chairmen of Senate Standing Committees U.S. Senate Historical Office, January 2005.

Canadian Relations
1888 establishments in Washington, D.C.
1921 disestablishments in Washington, D.C.
Canada–United States relations